The Penguin Book of Modern African Poetry (in an earlier 1963 edition Modern Poetry from Africa) is a 1984 poetry anthology edited by Gerald Moore and Ulli Beier. It consists mainly of poems written in English and English translations of French or Portuguese poetry; poems written in African languages were included only in the authors' translations. The poems are arranged by the country of the poet, then by their date of birth. The following sections list the poets included in the collection.

Angola
Agostinho Neto
António Jacinto
Costa Andrade
Ngudia Wendel
Jofre Rocha
Ruy Duarte de Carvalho

Benin (Dahomey)
Emile Ologoudou

Cameroun
Simon Mpondo
Mbella Sonne Dipoko
Patrice Kayo

Cape Verde Islands
Onésima Silveira

Congo Republic
Tchicaya U Tam’si
Jean-Baptiste Tati Loutard
Emmanuel Dongala

Côte d'Ivoire
Joseph Miezan Bognini
Charles Nokan

Gambia
Lenrie Peters

Ghana
Ellis Ayitey Komey
Kwesi Brew
Kofi Awoonor
Atukwei Okai
Kofi Anyidoho

Guinea
Ahmed Tidjani Cissé

Kenya
Khadambi Asalache
Jonathan Kariara
Jared Angira

Madagascar
Jean-Joseph Rabearivelo
Flavien Ranaivo

Malawi
David Rubadiri
Felix Mnthali
Jack Mapanje

Mali
Yambo Ouologuem

Mauretania
Oumar Ba

Mauritius
Edouard Maunick

Mozambique
José Craveirinha
Noémia de Sousa
Valente Malangatana
Jorge Rebelo

Nigeria
Gabriel Okara
Christopher Okigbo
Wole Soyinka
John Pepper Clark
Frank Aig-Imoukhuede
Okogbuli Wonodi
Michael Echeruo
Pol N Ndu
Onwuchekwa Jemie
Aig Higo
Molara Ogundipe-Leslie
Niyi Osundare
Odia Ofeimun
Funso Aiyejina

San Tomé
Alda do Espirito Santo

Senegal
Léopold Sédar Senghor
Birago Diop
David Diop

Sierra Leone
Syl Cheney-Coker

South Africa
Dennis Brutus
Mazisi Kunene
Sipho Sepamla
Keorapetse Kgositsile
Oswald Mbuyiseni Mtshali
Arthur Nortje
Mongane Wally Serote

Uganda
Okot p'Bitek

Zaire
Antoine-Rober Bolamba
Mukala Kadima-Nzuji

Zambia
Gwendoline Konie

References

Poetry anthologies
African poetry
1984 books
Penguin Books books